The 2004 African Women's Championship  was the sixth edition of the African Women's Championship (now known as the Africa Women Cup of Nations), the biennial international football championship organised by the Confederation of African Football (CAF) for the women's national teams of Africa. It was held in South Africa between 18 September and 3 October 2004.

Nigeria won its sixth title, after defeating Cameroon 5–0 in the final.

South Africa were elected as hosts on 12 December 2003.

Qualification

South Africa qualified automatically as hosts, while the remaining seven spots were determined by the qualifying rounds, which took place from May to July 2004. From this tournament onwards, the defending champions does not receive automatic qualification.

Format
Qualification ties were played on a home-and-away two-legged basis. If the aggregate score was tied after the second leg, the away goals rule would be applied, and if still level, the penalty shoot-out would be used to determine the winner (no extra time would be played).

The seven winners of the final round qualified for the final tournament.

Qualified teams

Algeria appeared for the first time in the tournament. 

1 Bold indicates champions for that year. Italic indicates hosts for that year.
2 Mali qualified as lucky loser after both DR Congo and Gabon (who were due to play each other) withdrew.

Format
The eight teams were divided into two groups of four teams each. The top two teams in the groups advanced to the semi-finals.

The teams were ranked according to points (3 points for a win, 1 point for a draw, 0 points for a loss).

Results

Group stage

Group A

Group B

Knockout stage
In the knockout stage, if a match is level at the end of normal playing time, extra time is played (two periods of 15 minutes each) and followed, if necessary, by kicks from the penalty mark to determine the winner, except for the third place match where no extra time is played.

Semi finals

Third place match

Final

Awards

Statistics

Team statistics

Goalscorers
Perpetua Nkwocha was the top scorer of the event with nine goals. In total, 48 goals were scored by 27 players.
9 goals

 Perpetua Nkwocha

4 goals

 Cynthia Uwak

3 goals

 Séraphine Mbida

2 goals

 Nabila Imloul
 Françoise Bella
 Stéphanie Mekongo
 Belay Tutu
 Akua Anokyewaa
 Bernice Asante
 Vera Okolo
 Nomsa Moyo

1 goal

 Naïma Laouadi
 Farida Sedhane
 Marceline Mete
 Feleke Addis
 Birtukan Gebrekirstos
 Anita Amenuku
 Adjoa Bayor
 Gloria Foriwa
 Fatoumata Diarra
 Man Keita
 Ajuma Ameh
 Effioanwan Ekpo
 Felicia Eze
 Portia Modise
 Veronica Phewa
 Marjory Nyaumwe

References

External links
Tables & results at RSSSF.com
Tables & results at BBC Online

CAF
Women's Africa Cup of Nations tournaments
International association football competitions hosted by South Africa
Women
September 2004 sports events in Africa
October 2004 sports events in Africa
2004 in South African women's sport